Jalama Beach County Park is a seaside campground and park located in Santa Barbara County, California, approximately  southwest of Lompoc, California, off California State Route 1.

History
Jalama was once the site of a Chumash People settlement named "Halama," "Jalam," "Xalam," or "Shilimaqstush." With the arrival of Spanish missionaries and the establishment of the La Purisima Mission in 1787, the inhabitants were relocated to the mission and the settlement was reportedly abandoned.

Following California's admission to the United States, the park became the property of the Atlantic Richfield Oil Company (ARCO). Despite being private property, citizens of nearby Lompoc frequently camped at the beach. In May 1943, the Atlantic Richfield Oil Company agreed to donate  of the beach to the County of Santa Barbara for use as a park.  In 2007, the California Coastal Commission transferred an additional  of privately held land to the County of Santa Barbara to further expand the beach.

Features
Today, Jalama features day-use picnic areas along with overnight camping facilities. There are 107 campsites, with 31 sites including electrical hookups and dump stations.  
The park also features the Jalama Beach Store, including the Jalama Grill.

See also
List of beaches in California

References

Beaches of Southern California
Parks in Santa Barbara County, California
Beaches of Santa Barbara County, California